Albert Lloyd George Rees CBE, DSc, FAA (1916–1989) was an Australian chemical physicist.

He was born the son of the Rev. G.P. Rees of Melbourne, Australia and educated at Carey Baptist Grammar School, at Kew, Victoria, Australia. He then worked part-time as a laboratory assistant at Melbourne University whilst studying for a Chemistry degree, which he obtained in 1936. After further study for an M.Sc (awarded in 1938) he travelled to England to work at Imperial College. As war had broken out en route he found himself investigating  potential war gases, for which he was awarded a PhD in 1941.

After a few years of research at Philips Electrical Industries U.K., where he led a team studying problems associated with the manufacture of cathode ray tubes, he returned to Australia to take up a post at CSIR in Melbourne as leader of a new Section of Chemical Physics devoted to the application of physical techniques to chemical problems, including protein structure investigations, chemico-physical studies of the solid state, the determination of molecular structure and energetics, and the development of new and improved chemico-physical techniques. In 1958, having grown to a staff of 30 and equipped with X-ray diffraction equipment, a mass spectrometer, an ultra-violet and an infra-red spectrometer, the section became the Chemical Physics Division.

He was elected a fellow of the Australian Chemical Institute in 1948 and awarded their Rennie (1945), Smith (1951) and Leighton (1970) Medals. He became a fellow of the Australian Academy of Science in 1954 and was awarded CBE in 1978.

He retired from CSIRO in 1978 and died in 1989. He had married Marion Mofflin and had 3 daughters.

Lloyd Rees Lecture
In 1990, the Council of the Australian Academy of Science agreed on the proposal of Sir Alan Walsh FAA to initiate a series of lectures by distinguished researchers in chemical physics, to recognise the contributions of Rees to science, industry and education.

The award has been made to:
 2018 — Paul Mulvaney
 2016 — Keith Nugent
 2014 — Cathy Foley
 2012 — Joanne Etheridge
 2010 — Stephen W. Wilkins
 2008 — Michelle Simmons, Atomic electronics: When will scaling reach its limit? 
 2006 — Jose Varghese
 2004 — Peter Hannaford
 2002 — D. Cockayne
 2000 — Peter Malcolm Colman
 1998 — R.A. Lee
 1996 — William R. Blevin
 1993 — William Edwin James
 1991 — John M. Cowley

References

1916 births
1989 deaths
Australian chemical engineers
Australian Commanders of the Order of the British Empire
Fellows of the Australian Academy of Science
Scientists from Melbourne
21st-century Australian scientists
Alumni of Imperial College London
People educated at Carey Baptist Grammar School
University of Melbourne alumni